The  is a special body of the Japanese Ministry of Education, Culture, Sports, Science and Technology (MEXT). It was set up in 1968 to promote Japanese arts and culture.

The agency's budget for FY 2018 rose to ¥107.7 billion.

Overview
The agency's Cultural Affairs Division disseminates information about the arts within Japan and internationally, and the Cultural Properties Protection Division protects the nation's cultural heritage. The Cultural Affairs Division is concerned with such areas as art and culture promotion, art copyrights, and improvements in the national language. It also supports both national and local arts and cultural festivals, and it funds traveling cultural events in music, theater, dance, art exhibitions, and film-making. Special prizes are offered to encourage young artists and established practitioners, and some grants are given each year to enable them to train abroad. The agency funds national museums of modern art in Kyoto and Tokyo and The National Museum of Western Art in Tokyo, which exhibit both Japanese and international shows. The agency also supports the Japan Art Academy, which honors eminent persons of arts and letters, appointing them to membership and offering ￥3.5 million in prize money. Awards are made in the presence of the Emperor, who personally bestows the highest accolade, the Order of Culture. In 1989, for the first time two women — a writer and a costume designer — were nominated for the Order of Cultural Merit, another official honor carrying the same stipend.

The Cultural Properties Protection Division originally was established to oversee restorations after World War II. As of April 2018, it was responsible for 1,805 historic sites, including the ancient capitals of Asuka, Heijokyo, and Fujiwara, 410 scenic places, and 1,027 national monuments, and for such indigenous fauna as ibis and storks. In addition, over 10,000 items had the lesser designation of Important Cultural Properties, with fine arts and crafts accounting for the largest share, with over 10,000 so designated.

The government protects buried properties, of which some 300,000 had been identified. During the 1980s, many important prehistoric and historic sites were investigated by the archaeological institutes that the agency funded, resulting in about 2,000 excavations in 1989. The wealth of material unearthed shed new light on the controversial period of the formation of the Japanese state.

A 1975 amendment to the Cultural Properties Protection Act of 1897 enabled the Agency for Cultural Affairs to designate traditional areas and buildings in urban centers for preservation. From time to time, various endangered traditional artistic skills are added to the agency's preservation roster, such as the 1989 inclusion of a kind of ancient doll making.

One of the most important roles of the Cultural Properties Protection Division is to preserve the traditional arts and crafts and performing arts through their living exemplars. Individual artists and groups, such as a dance troupe or a pottery village, are designated as mukei bunkazai (intangible cultural assets) in recognition of their skill. Major exponents of the traditional arts have been designated as ningen kokuho (living national treasures). About seventy persons are so honored at any one time; in 1989 the six newly designated masters were a kyogen (comic) performer, a chanter of bunraku (puppet) theater, a performer of the nagauta shamisen (a special kind of stringed instrument), the head potter making Nabeshima decorated porcelain ware, the top pictorial lacquer-ware artist, and a metal-work expert. Each was provided a lifetime annual pension of ￥2 million and financial aid for training disciples.

A number of institutions come under the aegis of the Agency for Cultural Affairs: the national museums of Japanese and Asian art in Tokyo, Kyoto, Nara, Osaka and Fukuoka, the cultural properties research institutes at Tokyo and Nara, and the national theaters. During the 1980s, the National Noh Theatre and the National Bunraku Theater were constructed by the government.

As of April 2021, it is led by the Commissioner for Cultural Affairs, Shunichi Tokura.

The agency is based in the Chiyoda Ward of Tokyo. Main parts of the agency will move to Kyoto in 2022 or later, while other parts will remain in Tokyo.

List of commissioners
Hidemi Kon (June 15, 1968 – July 1, 1972)
 (July 1, 1972 – September 12, 1975)
 (September 12, 1975 – September 20, 1977)
Tadashi Inumaru (犬丸直; September 20, 1977 –June 6, 1980)
Shinichiro Sano (佐野文一郎; June 6, 1980 – July 5, 1983)
Isao Suzuki (鈴木勲; July 5, 1983 – March 31, 1985)
Shumon Miura (April 1, 1985 – September 1, 1986)
 (September 1, 1986 – June 10, 1988)
Hiroshi Ueki (植木浩; June 10, 1988 – July 1, 1990)
 (July 1, 1990 – July 1, 1992)
Hiroyuki Uchida (内田弘保; July 1, 1992 – July 25, 1994)
Atsuko Tōyama (July 25, 1994 – January 9, 1996)
Shigeru Yoshida (吉田茂; January 9, 1996 – July 1, 1997)
 (July 1, 1997 – June 15, 2000)
 (June 15, 2000 – January 18, 2002)
Hayao Kawai (January 18, 2002 – November 1, 2006)
Shinji Kondo (近藤信司; November 1, 2006 – April 1, 2007)
 (April 1, 2007 – July 14, 2009)
 (July 14, 2009 – July 29, 2010)
 (July 30, 2010 – July 7, 2013)
 (July 8, 2013 – April 1, 2016)
 (April 1, 2016 – March 31, 2021)
Shunichi Tokura (since April 1, 2021)

Organization

The agency contains the following divisions:
Policy Division – personnel matters, budget, awards system, dissemination, research
Planning and Coordination Division – diet matters, promotion, museums, theaters, Independent Administrative Institutions
Cultural Economy and International Affairs Division – economy strategy, international cooperation
Japanese Language Division – improvement of Japanese language, education for foreigners
Copyright Division – copyrights, publishing rights, treaties
Cultural Resources Utilization Division – World Cultural Heritage, intangible cultural heritage, Japan Heritage
First Cultural Properties Division – tangible cultural properties other than buildings, intangible cultural properties, conservation techniques
Second Cultural Properties Division – buildings, monuments, preservation districts
Religious Affairs Division – certification, technical guidance and advice
Culture and Creativity Division – utilization of cultural resources, support for cultural creation
Arts and Culture Division – liaison for organizations in Tokyo, educational standards for the arts
Food Culture Division
Cultural Tourism Division

See also
Culture of Japan
Cultural Property (Japan)
National Treasure (Japan)
Living National Treasure (Japan)
Japanese copyright law
Freedom of religion in Japan

References

External links

Agency for Cultural Affairs website
Cultural Properties for Future Generations

Culture ministries
Cultural Properties of Japan
Government agencies of Japan
Japanese culture
Arts in Japan
Languages of Japan
Government agencies established in 1968
1968 establishments in Japan